The Saint-Philibert's chapel (French: Chapelle Saint-Philibert) is a former Roman Catholic chapel in Trégunc in Brittany.

History
Saint-Philibert's chapel became a parish church in 1946. It is curiously built on a hillside, and the nave there is a drop of 1.23 meter. The various construction dates are known thanks to an inscription: "END THE YEAR 1558 A BA 1575 DONE".

Gallery

References

Bibliography

  Collectif, Le patrimoine des communes du Finistère, éditions Flohic, 1998, 1565p. 

Roman Catholic churches completed in 1575
16th-century Roman Catholic church buildings in France
Chapels in France
Churches in Finistère
Trégunc
Monuments historiques of Finistère